Shootout is a gun battle between armed groups (the article includes a list of notable shootouts).

Shootout, shoot-out, or shoot out may also refer to:

Arts and entertainment 
 Duke City Shootout, a movie-making contest
 Shoot Out, a 1971 American Western film
 Shoot Out (TV series), an Australian association football series, 2012–2019
 Shootout (1985 video game)
 Shootout (album), by The Mother Hips, 1996
 The Shootout (film), a 1992 Hong Kong action film
 Shootout (TV series), an American talk and interview show, 2003–2008
 Shootout!, an American TV documentary series, 2005–2006
 Shootout! The Game, a video game

Sport 
 Penalty shootout, a method of determining a winner in sports matches that would have otherwise been drawn or tied
 Penalty shoot-out (association football)
 Penalty shoot-out (field hockey)
 Shootout (ice hockey)
 Shootout (poker), a poker tournament format
 Snooker Shoot Out, a tournament in snooker

See also